Dioryctria resiniphila is a species of snout moth in the genus Dioryctria. It was described by Segerer and Pröse, in 1997, and it was described from Greece. It was recorded from China in 2009.

The wingspan is 26–30 mm.

The larvae feed on Abies cephalonica. They feed in the cones of their host plant.

References

Moths described in 1997
resiniphila
Moths of Europe
Moths of Asia